Komaram Bheem Asifabad district, officially known as Kumuram Bheem Asifabad district, is a district in the Indian state of Telangana. The town of Asifabad is its district headquarters and kagaznagar as its largest town. It is named after Gond tribal leader Komaram Bheem. It was earlier part of Adilabad district and it became a new district in 2016. The district share boundaries with Adilabad, Nirmal, Mancherial districts and with the state boundary of Maharashtra. It is the second most backward district in India, according to the 2018 NITI Aayog ranking.

History 
The predominantly tribal region around the town of Asifabad was ruled by many dynasties like the Kakatiyas, Mauryas, Satavahanas, Chalukyas, Qutub Shahis ,Asaf Jahis and Gonds. In the early 20th century, the district was known as Jangam and Asifabad served as its headquarters. In 1905, the district was merged into the neighbouring Adilabad district. In 1913, Asifabad was made as headquarters of the district prior to the status being lost to Adilabad town in 1941. Following the creation of Telangana state, the districts were re-organized in 2016. As a result, Asifabad district was again carved from Adilabad district and was renamed after the Gond martyr Komaram Bheem.

Geography 
Hills dominate the western part of the district and Pranhita river runs parallel to the east.

It is home to endangered species of vultures which have made Palarapu rocks their home in the forests of Bejjur. The Sirpur forest is also home to tigers and other wild animals.  Cotton and Paddy are the major crops grown in this area.

Demographics 

As of the 2011 Census, the district has a population of 515,812 people, with 998 females for every 1000 males. Scheduled Castes and Scheduled Tribes make up 15.82% and 25.91% of the population respectively.

At the time of the 2011 census, 38.10% of the population spoke Telugu, 28.01% Marathi, 12.48% Gondi, 7.28% Urdu, 3.59% Lambadi, 3.05% Kolami, 2.55% Koya and 1.46% Hindi as their first language.

Divisions 
This district has two revenue divisions; Asifabad and Kagaznagar and is sub-divided into 15 mandals. Present MLA of Asifabad constituency is Athram Sakku and Sirpur-T is Koneru Konappa.

Mandals

Notable people
 Komaram Bheem, freedom fighter 
 Konda Laxman Bapuji, freedom fighter

Places of interest 
 Jode ghat
 Komaram Bheem reservoir
 Komaram Bheem waterfalls
 Vattivagu reservoir
 Gangapur temple, Rebbena
 Jodeghat, Kerameri
 Kadamba forest reserve, a tiger reserve
 Kerameri ghats
 Komaram Bheem irrigational project
 Palarapuguttalu, a vulture reserve
 Savatula Gundam Waterfalls
 Shiva Mallana temple
 Shivakeshava temple, Wankidi
 Sirpur forest reserve
 Thrishul Pahad
 Tonkini Hanuman temple, Sirpur-T

See also 
List of districts in Telangana

References 

 
Districts of Telangana